Francis Chepsiror Kirwa (born November 28, 1974) is a Finnish marathon runner of Kenyan origin. In 2005, he adopted Finnish nationality in order to compete internationally in the marathon, and run for his home nation at the IAAF World Championships in Helsinki. He also set a personal best of 2:11:01 by winning the gold medal at the Maratona Sant’Antonio in Padua, Italy.

Kirwa represented his adopted nation Finland at the 2008 Summer Olympics in Beijing, where he competed for the men's marathon. He successfully finished the race in fourteenth place by twenty-two seconds behind Spain's José Manuel Martínez, outside his personal best time of 2:14:22.

Kirwa currently resides in Lahti, since he left from Kenya in 2002. He also trains full-time for marathon and cross-country races at Lahden Ahkera, under his personal and head coach Timo Vuorimaa.

References

External links

Profile – Suomen Olympiakomitea 
NBC 2008 Olympics profile

Finnish male marathon runners
Finnish people of Kenyan descent
Living people
Olympic athletes of Finland
Athletes (track and field) at the 2008 Summer Olympics
People from Lahti
1974 births
Kenyan expatriate sportspeople in Finland
Naturalized citizens of Finland